Luc De Rijck was a Belgian professional football player. He died at the age of 25 after suffering a heart attack.

De Rijck was a leading top-scorer for his club and in the second division at the time of his death. His heart attack was initiated by an air bubble injected when he was connected to an oxygen machine at the club's physician offices.

See also
 K.V. Turnhout

References

1965 births
1991 deaths
Belgian footballers
Association football forwards
Lierse S.K. players
KFC Turnhout players
Challenger Pro League players
Belgian sportspeople in doping cases
Doping cases in association football
People from Lier, Belgium
Footballers from Antwerp Province